Luigi Narduzzi (3 June 1932 – 20 December 1970) was an Italian fencer. He competed in the individual and team sabre events at the 1956 Summer Olympics.

References

External links
 

1932 births
1970 deaths
Italian male sabre fencers
Olympic fencers of Italy
Fencers at the 1956 Summer Olympics